The People's Liberation Army Navy Marine Corps (PLANMC), also known as the People's Liberation Army Marine Corps (PLAMC), is the marine force of the People's Liberation Army (PLA) and one of five major branches of the PLA Navy (PLAN) responsible for amphibious warfare, expeditionary operations and rapid responses. It currently consists of seven 6,000-man combined armed brigades and four other supporting brigades including aviation, engineering & chemical defense, artillery and service-support brigades for a total of 40,000. It further includes a brigade-level special operations unit called "Jiaolong Commando Unit"

History 

The present PLAN Marine Corps was originally established in April 1953 during the Chinese Civil War by Communist Chinese troops to conduct amphibious operations against islands held by the Nationalists. By the end of the Korean War, the PLAN Marine Corps numbered 110,000 personnel organized in eight divisions. However, the organization was disbanded in October 1957 when the leadership of China abandoned any plans to seize the island of Taiwan. Following the disbanding of the Marine Corps, the People's Liberation Army Navy (PLAN) did maintain a naval infantry force, which consisted of several infantry and amphibious tank regiments.

In 1979 the Central Military Commission of China re-established the Marine Corps and organized it under the PLAN. On 5 May 1980, the 1st Marine Brigade was activated on Hainan.

In view of the growing tension between Mainland China and the Republic of China during the 1990s, the number of PLAN Marine Corps units was again increased. 1st Marine Brigade China was reinforced and rearmed. In July 1998, the 164th Motorized Infantry Division of the PLA Ground Force’s 41st Group Army had been transferred to the PLAN South Sea Fleet and became the 164th Marine Brigade, with its homebase in Zhanjiang, Guangdong Province. In February 2017, it was reported that the 77th Motorized Infantry Brigade of the 26th Group Army was transferred to the PLAN.

The PLAN Marine Corps participated in multiple international exercises, including participation in RIMPAC, and engages with USMC in mutual training and friendly cultural exchanges during the Bush and Obama administrations as part of its "tranquillity and good order" policy according to its navy chief. However, with the Trump administration the PLA Navy and PLANMC were dis-invited from the 2018 Rim of the Pacific and the US Marines are trained to fight against the PLANMC.

Organization 
The PLAN Marine Corps is subordinate to the PLA Navy Headquarters, the Joint Staff Department and the Chairman of the Central Military Commission (CMC). 

18,000 marines are under the Southern Theater Command, with 6,000 being under Eastern Theater Command and 12,000 being under Northern Theater Command. These brigades possess combined arms units, including armor, artillery, missile, air defense, and logistics.

The Six brigades are as follows:
 1st and 2nd (ex-164th) Marine Brigades – both based in Zhanjiang 
 3rd Marine Brigade based in Jinjiang 
 4th Marine Brigade based in Jieyang 
 5th Marine Brigade in Laoshan
 6th Marine Brigade based in Haiyang .

Each Marine Brigade is organized into the following elements:
 1 × Brigade HQ and Service Company 
 3 x Marine Combined Arms Battalion (1 x Heavy with ZTD-05 Amphibious Tank, 1 × Medium with ZBD-05 Amphibious IFV and 1 × Light with VP4 ATV  )
 1 x Air Assault Battalion
 1 x Marine Artillery Battalion 
 1 × Air Defense Battalion 
 Marine Reconnaissance Battalion
 Combat Support Battalion
 Service Support Battalion

PLAN Marine Corps is not the only force capable of amphibious operations in People's Liberation Army. Marine Corps are primarily composed of light infantry, supplementing the heavily armed PLA Ground Force amphibious combined-arms brigades. Under the joint-operation command structure, Marine Corps will establish landing parameters before the ground force engages.

Equipment 

 Personnel equipment
 Type 95 Assault Rifle
 Type 95B Carbine
 QBB-95 Squad Automatic Weapon
 QBU-88 Designated Marksman Rifle
 QCW-05 Submachine Gun
 QSZ-92 Pistol
 QBS-06 underwater rifle
 QLZ-87 grenade launcher
 QBU-10 sniper rifle
 QLU-11 grenade launcher/sniper
 PF-89 rocket launcher
 PF-97 rocket launcher
 DZJ-08 rocket launcher

 Armour
 Type 15 tank
 ZTL-11 Amphibious Assault Gun
 ZBL-08 Amphibious IFV
 ZSL-10 Amphibious APC
 ZTD-05 Amphibious Assault Gun
 ZBD-05 Amphibious IFV
 ZSD-05 Amphibious APC
 WZ551 Wheeled APC

 Aircraft
 Z-9WA attack helicopter
 Z-9C utility helicopter
 Z-18 transport helicopter

 Artillery and ammunition
 PLZ-07B self-propelled howitzer
 PLL-09 self-propelled howitzer
 Type 89 self-propelled howitzer
 HJ-8 Anti-tank missile
 HJ-73 Anti-tank missile

Chinese marines use the QBZ-95 as their main armament, though this is set to change as the PLA is set to replace the QBZ-95 with the QBZ-191 as its standard service rifle. The Type 07 Oceanic Camouflage used by the marines is likewise scheduled to be replaced by the Xingkong camouflage pattern. The marines also make use of GPS and night vision systems to enhance their fighting capabilities.

The PLAN marines are equipped with amphibious light tanks and armored personnel carriers. The Type 63A is the newest light tank in Chinese service. It is based on the hull of the older Type 63 (which in turn is based on the Soviet PT76 amphibious light tank). The Type 63A features a number of improvements, in particular the new welded turret which features much greater armour protection and the 105mm main gun (capable of firing standard NATO projectiles as well as the gun launched anti-tank missile). The marines are believed to have continued operating the Type 63 and the non-amphibious Type 62 light tanks as secondary units. The Type 77 amphibious APC was the standard armoured transport for the marines for many decades. However, new designs have been adapted from the army to complement these aging transports. These include specially modified versions of the Type 89 and Type 63 APCs, with enhanced swimming capabilities. The Type 86 (or WZ501) IFV is also in service with the marines. Based on the Soviet BMP-1, it is armed with a single 73mm main gun and mounts an HJ73 ATGM (with max range of 3000 meters).

For air defense, Chinese marines employ a mix of automatic and manually operated anti-aircraft artillery systems, as well as short range surface-to-air missiles. The marines have been seen operating the new Type 95 self-propelled air defense platform on an amphibious hull similar to the Type 77 APC. This platform is armed with four 25mm cannon with a short ranged SAM combination to achieve effective killing capabilities against low flying targets at short ranges. The Type 89 self-propelled 122mm gun is the first SP artillery system in service with the marines since 1999. This adds additional accurate firepower to the PLAMC.

See also 

 Republic of China Marine Corps (part of the Republic of China Navy)
 People's Liberation Army Airborne Corps (part of the People's Liberation Army Air Force)
 People's Liberation Army Navy Coastal Defense Force
 People's Liberation Army special operations forces

References

External links 
 sinodefense.com

5
 
China
Military units and formations established in the 1950s